Baltasar Brum is a town in the Artigas Department of northern Uruguay.

Geography
It is also the point where the railroad track from Montevideo splits in two directions, one towards Bella Unión and one towards Artigas.

History
Previously it was known as "Cabellos" and it may correspond to the village "Jacinto R. Sant-Anna" which was recognized as a "Pueblo" by Decree of 6 February 1918 in the area called "Estación Isla de Cabellos". On 1 November 1932, "the group of houses around Estación Cabellos" was declared a "Pueblo" (village) by the Act of Ley N° 8.907. On 4 January 1956, it was renamed after the President of Uruguay Baltasar Brum by the Act of Ley N° 12.266.

Population
In 2011, it had a population of 2,531.
 
Source: Instituto Nacional de Estadística de Uruguay

References

External links
INE map of Baltasar Brum

Populated places in the Artigas Department